Rowthiram is a 2011 Indian Tamil-language martial arts film written and directed by newcomer Gokul. Produced by R. B. Choudary, the film stars his son Jiiva and Shriya Saran, with Sentrayan, Jayaprakash and Lakshmi Ramakrishnan appearing in supporting roles. The story line of Rowthiram is nearly equal to  Udhayam the Tamil dubbed version of Telugu film Siva starring Nagarjuna Akkineni. It released on 12 August 2011.

Upon release, it opened to mixed reviews due to the weak storyline. However, the performances of Jiiva and Shriya received high praise from the critics and audience, alike. After a few days of the theatrical release, the ending of the film was changed, as per the response of the audience, to a positive one.

Plot
The film starts in the 1990s. A young Shiva (Jiiva) is trained in the ancient Indian martial art Kalaripayattu by his grandfather (Prakash Raj) to be bold and brave and fight against all odds, especially all that is evil. Shiva grows up with his grandfather's words as his Bhagavad Gita. However, Shiva's parents Udaya Murthy (Jayaprakash) and Lakshmi (Lakshmi Ramakrishnan) want him to lead a peaceful life. Shiva gets arrested by the police after fighting with a law student named Guna (Chaitanya Krishna), who is in Gowri's (Sentrayan) gang. Enters Priya (Shriya Saran), who is a law student and also the daughter of a police official (Babu Antony). She bails Shiva out and falls for him after seeing him fight for other people's good. Eventually, Shiva too falls for her.

Meanwhile, Guna wants revenge as Shiva had humiliated him in front of everyone. He wants Shiva dead. Things take a turn when Shiva goes to the bus stop with his friend to pick up Ramanujan's (Sathyan) father. There, a couple of rowdies kidnap a young girl. Shiva could not stand this and fights with them. Gowri was one of the rowdies there, and Shiva hits him. Gowri is infuriated and wants Shiva dead at any cost. Shiva's entire family stops talking to him, though he insisted that what he did was for the good. Shiva's sister Kavitha (Monica) eventually marries Ramanujan, and his brother (Srinath) marries his longtime love. These marriages happen without Shiva's knowledge, and he becomes shocked and shattered. He packs up and leaves his house since he realizes that his presence will only make things dangerous for his family. He takes his grandfather's photo along with him. The lawyer Kavitha helps Shiva escape when he is caught by police.

The climax is when Priya's father and Udaya Murthy convince Shiva to force him out of helping others, ruining his life, and concealing it with danger for him and Priya. Priya's father then receives a message that Gowri was arrested; however he escaped and the police shot him down, to that, Priya's father responded that he will come and see him in the hospital. Shiva travels with Priya's father in a car, where Priya's father advises Shiva to control his anger so that he will get Priya married to him, to which Shiva agrees. Suddenly, they hear a girl's voice. Shiva tries to get out of the car to save the girl. However, Priya's father stops him, asking to control his anger. Shiva could not, and he jumps from the car.

The movie first had a climax where the girl in trouble was Priya and she gets killed by a few rowdies. A few days later, the climax was changed whereby the girl who was dead was someone else, which means that Shiva has not changed his character of trying to help others.

Cast

 Jiiva as Shiva
 Shriya Saran as Priya
 Sentrayan as Gowri
 Jayaprakash as Udaya Murthy, Shiva's father
 Lakshmy Ramakrishnan as Lakshmi, Shiva's mother
 Ganesh Acharya as Kittu
 Chaitanya Krishna as Guna
 Babu Antony as Priya's father
 Sathyan as Ramanujan
 Srinath as Ashok
 VJ Monica as Shiva's sister
 Robo Shankar as Kittu's henchman
 Daniel Annie Pope
 Prakash Raj as Shiva's grandfather (cameo appearance)
 Chinmayi in a cameo appearance

Production
The film's shooting was held in various places in Tamil Nadu. One song from the film was shot at France, Germany, Italy, Holland, Spain, Portugal, UK, Ukraine, Japan, Thailand. The team had canned some scenes in the temple town Villianur. Reportedly, some portions of this film was re-shot after Jiiva's previous venture Ko became a huge success. Shriya Saran, who was signed up to play Jiiva's pair in Rowthiram, was busy with Don Seenu and Chikku Bukku and hence could not allot dates for Rowthiram. The team, however, completed two schedules without the lead actress and waited patiently for her dates. Sources say that nearly half the film has been shot without the lead actress. Shriya won her role in the film by chance. The actress was at the shooting spot when the first shot was on and debut director Gokul instantly felt that she was the one who could carry off the role to perfection. After a discussion with producer RB Choudhury and Jiiva, Gokul signed up Shriya to play Jiiva's pair in Rowthiram. The film was completed in June 2011 after two and a half years in the making.

Soundtrack

The soundtrack was composed by Prakash Nikki. It was released on 18 July 2011 at Hotel Green Park in Chennai. The song "Maalai Mangum" became popular. The film's score and an extra song in the climax was composed by Mohanji, who later worked on Vidiyum Varai Pesu and Mugam Nee Agam Naan.

Release

Critical reception
Behindwoods gave a 2/5 star rating and said "Rowthiram has positives going in its favor. If the screen play had been more linear and taut, it would have made a huge impact." further citing "Some scenes are neatly done especially the family and the romance blocks. However, these are not sufficient to buoy the story up as there is inconsistency in the pace. While the first half fairly manages to hold the attention, Gokul stutters to keep the audience hooked in the second half and his struggle to move the film forward becomes evident. The long action sequences also exhausts. The snag for Rowthiram comes from its lengthiness."

Pavithra Srinivasan of Rediff gave a score of 2/5 and stated that "The problem with most Tamil debutant directors trying to ape trend-setters like Mani Ratnam, Sasikumar, Gautam Menon, etc. is that they faithfully imitate the production values, but end up messing up the characterisations and storyline. And when the end product is also supposed to be an old-fashioned masala in a new tetra-pack, even the fact that the hero is someone who can actually act, can't save it. This is pretty much the problem that afflicts Super Good Films' Rowthiram (Fury), written and directed by Gokul. " Malathi Rangarajan from The Hindu said "You understand Gokul's urge to conceive things differently even within the commercial format. But little can be achieved when the narration lacks fizz. And there lies the problem." Another portal, Indiaglitz said "Gokul seems to have done his best in the first half. But a swift screenplay especially in the second half would have made a world of difference." and praised Jeeva stating "Jiiva carries the whole burden on his shoulders. As an angry young man who is waiting to clean the society, Jiiva is impressive. He seems to be getting mature as an actor with each film. But sadly the weak script lets him down here."

Shriya Saran received an ITFA award in the best actress category.

Box office
In the UK the film collected  10.75 lakhs in two weeks. In Chennai, the film had a good opening and collected  2.45 crore in two weeks.

Re-release
After the film's release, there was a widespread issue that it was a tad too long. When this issue was brought to Jeeva's notice he decided to shorten the film's length after discussing it with director Gokul. In a press meet, Jeeva has said that the film's shortened version would receive the response that they had been expecting.

References

External links
 Rowthiram Official Website
 
 

2011 films
2011 action drama films
2010s Tamil-language films
Films shot in France
Indian action drama films
Films scored by Prakash Nikki
Films scored by Ilaiyaraaja
2011 directorial debut films
Indian films about revenge
Super Good Films films